Altea is a town in the Alicante province of eastern Spain.

Altea may also refer to:

People 
 Fernando Muñoz Altea (1925–2018), the King of Arms of the Royal House of Bourbon-Two Sicilies
 Giuseppe Altea (born 1997), Italian football player
 Rosemary Altea, medium and healer

Organizations 
 Balonmano Altea, a handball team based in Altea, Alicante, Spain
 Unión Deportiva Altea, a Spanish football team based in Altea, in the Valencian Community

Other uses 
 SEAT Altea, a compact MPV from Spanish automaker SEAT, named after the town
 ALTEA, a program to measure the exposure of crewmembers to cosmic radiation aboard the International Space Station
 Altea (a.k.a. Aritia), a kingdom on the fictional continent of Akaneia in the Fire Emblem game series
 Altéa, a technology platform by Amadeus IT Group for airlines reservation, inventory and departure control
 , a ship used for training Customs Officers in Liverpool, England
 Nervures Altea, a French paraglider design